Sineleotris is a genus of freshwater sleepers native to eastern Asia, where found in Hainan, Hong Kong, Laos and Vietnam.

Species
There are currently three recognized species in this genus:
 Sineleotris chalmersi (Nichols & C. H. Pope, 1927)
 Sineleotris namxamensis I. S. Chen & Kottelat, 2004
 Sineleotris saccharae Herre, 1940

References

Odontobutidae